Los Compadres was a famous Cuban trova duo formed by Lorenzo Hierrezuelo in 1947. At the time Lorenzo had a singing duo with María Teresa Vera, and this partnership continued alongside the new venture. His first partner in Los Compadres was Compay Segundo (a famous trova singer and guitarist in his own right), who became the second voice and armónico player of the duo. Later, when Compay Segundo moved on, Lorenzo teamed up with his brother, Rey Caney, keeping the same name for the duo. Both partnerships made many recordings and toured widely in Latin America and the United States.

References 

Cuban musical duos
Musical groups established in 1947
1947 establishments in Cuba
Sibling musical duos